William Loftus Coffey (born 1885 in Dublin; Death unknown) was an Irish cricketer. He made his debut for Ireland in a match against a team representing New York City in September 1909. Later that month, he played his second and final match for Ireland, playing a first-class match against Philadelphia, which was his only first-class match.

References

1885 births
Year of death missing
Irish cricketers
Sportspeople from County Wicklow
Gentlemen of Ireland cricketers